Mr Moto Takes A Vacation (1939) is a Norman Foster-directed entry in the Mr. Moto film series, with Lionel Atwill and Joseph Schildkraut and George P. Huntley, Jr, as Archie Featherstone, in supporting roles.

This was the last Mr. Moto film that Peter Lorre appeared in. The movie was the seventh filmed in the series. However it was not released until after Mr. Moto in Danger Island, which was the last filmed out of eight Mr. Moto films from 20th Century Fox.

Plot summary

American archeologist Howard Stevens (John 'Dusty' King) recovers the ancient crown of the Queen of Sheba; the priceless artifact is shipped to the San Francisco Museum. Ostensibly on vacation, Mr. Moto (Peter Lorre) shows up to guard the crown from a notorious master thief, whom everyone assumes is dead. Using a variety of disguises, the very-much-alive thief succeeds in pilfering the crown-only to discover that Moto has remained three steps ahead of him throughout the film.

Cast 
 Peter Lorre as Mr. Moto
 Joseph Schildkraut as Hendrik Manderson
 Lionel Atwill as Professor Hildebrand
 Virginia Field as Eleanore Kirke
 John 'Dusty' King as Howard Stevens (as John King)
 Iva Stewart as Susan French
 George P. Huntley, Jr as Archie Featherstone 
 Victor Varconi as Paul Borodoff
 John Bleifer as Wendling
 Honorable Wu as Wong
 Morgan Wallace as David Perez
 Anthony Warde as Joe Rubla
 Harry Strang as O'Hara, Museum Guard
 John Davidson as Prince Suleid
 unbilled players include Jimmy Aubrey, Willie Best, Stanley Blystone, Gino Corrado, Ralph Dunn, Hank Mann, and Cyril Ring

Production
The film was announced in July 1938.

John King was cast in August 1938.

Iva Stewart, a member of Fox's stock company, was given her first dramatic lead in the film. Lionel Atwill made the movie as the first in a four-picture deal with Fox.

Reception
The film was released after Mr. Moto in Danger Island though it was filmed before it. The Los Angeles Times said "the plot misses fire on occasion." The Monthly Film Bulletin said it was "lifted out of the rut by the clever acting of Peter Lorre". The New York Times said it "seems to be missing on several cylinders".

End of Series
Fox would go on to make Mr. Moto in Danger Island. In December 1938, Fox announced they would not give Lorre a new contract but that he still had four Moto films to make.  However Lorre left the studio in July 1939, effectively ending the series.

Home media
This film, along with Mr. Moto in Danger Island, Mr. Moto's Gamble, Mr. Moto's Last Warning and (as a DVD extra) The Return of Mr. Moto, was released on DVD in 2007 by 20th Century Fox as part of The Mr. Moto Collection, Volume Two.

See also
Think Fast, Mr. Moto 
Thank You, Mr. Moto
Mr. Moto's Gamble 
Mr. Moto Takes a Chance 
Mysterious Mr. Moto
Mr. Moto's Last Warning 
Mr. Moto in Danger Island
The Return of Mr. Moto

References

External links 

 
 
 
 

1939 films
1939 crime drama films
20th Century Fox films
Films directed by Norman Foster
American crime drama films
American black-and-white films
Films produced by Sol M. Wurtzel
Films scored by Samuel Kaylin
1930s English-language films
1930s American films